The 2019–20 Columbia Lions women's basketball team represented Columbia University during the 2019–20 NCAA Division I women's basketball season. The Lions, led by fourth-year head coach Megan Griffith, played their home games at Levien Gymnasium and were members of the Ivy League. They finished the season 17–10, 8–6 in Ivy League play to finish in fourth place. The Lions qualified for Ivy Madness for the first time in the program's 34-year history, but the 2020 tournament was cancelled due to COVID-19.

Previous season
They finished the season 8–19, 4–10 in Ivy League play to finish in seventh place. They failed to qualify for the Ivy women's tournament.

Roster

Schedule

|-
!colspan=9 style=| Non-conference regular season

|-
!colspan=9 style=| Ivy League regular season

|-
!colspan=9 style=| Ivy League Tournament

See also
 2019–20 Columbia Lions men's basketball team

References

Columbia Lions women's basketball seasons
Columbia
Columbia
Columbia